Cold War History is a quarterly peer-reviewed academic journal covering the history of the Cold War. It was established in 2000 and is published by Routledge. The editors-in-chief are Bastiaan Bouwman (London School of Economics and Political Science) and Lindsay Aqui (University of London).

The journal is abstracted and indexed in America: History and Life, CSA Worldwide Political Science Abstracts, Historical Abstracts, International Bibliography of the Social Sciences, Arts & Humanities Citation Index, and the Social Sciences Citation Index. According to the Journal Citation Reports, the journal has a 2014 impact factor of 0.357.

References

External links 
 

English-language journals
Quarterly journals
Routledge academic journals
History journals
International relations journals
Publications established in 2000